Géza Lator (February 3, 1889 — December 15, 1976) was a Hungarian ice hockey player. He played for the Hungarian national team at the 1928 Winter Olympics and several World Championships.

References

External links

1889 births
1976 deaths
Hungarian ice hockey right wingers
Ice hockey players at the 1928 Winter Olympics
Olympic ice hockey players of Hungary
People from Sighetu Marmației